Colima has 18 unique radio stations, with three of those also broadcasting on AM in addition to FM. All of the stations are concentrated in the Colima, Manzanillo, and Tecomán areas.

Notes

References 

Colima